HMS Eskimo was a  frigate of the Royal Navy in service from 1963 to 1980. She was scrapped in 1992.

Eskimo was built by J. Samuel White, of Cowes, at a cost of £4,670,000. The frigate was launched on 20 March 1961 and commissioned on 21 February 1963 with the pennant number F119.

Service

'Eskimo' began her third commission in October 1966. Sailing from Portsmouth in May 1967, she arrived off Port Said on the morning of 5 June, but due to the outbreak of war between Israel and the surrounding Arab states (the six day war), she was unable to transit the Suez Canal as planned. ‘Eskimo’ then spent some three months in the Mediterranean (based primarily in Malta) before eventually sailing to the Middle East via Gibraltar, Simonstown (South Africa), two Beira patrols, and Mombasa, arriving on station in Bahrain in December of that year. She subsequently replaced her sister ship Ashanti off Aden in 1968 in support of the withdrawal of British troops from that colony. ‘Eskimo’ finally returned to the UK in May 1968 having spent a full twelve months away from home. Later in the year she took part in Portsmouth 'Navy Days'. Between 1966 and 1967 she was commanded by Simon Cassels.

During 1974 and 1975 she was commanded by Alan Grose.

Due to a manpower shortage in the Royal Navy, Eskimo was reduced to the reserve in 1980, being placed into the Standby Squadron, and in 1981 was put on the disposal list. In 1984 she was cannibalised for spare parts for three Tribal-class frigates sold to Indonesia. On 16 January 1986, Eskimo was towed from Portsmouth to Pembroke Dock to be used as a target, but was not used as such. In May 1992 she was towed from Pembroke to Bilbao, Spain to be scrapped.

References

Publications
 Blackman, Raymond V.B. Jane's Fighting Ships 1971–72. London: Sampson Low, Marston & Co, 1971. .
 
 Gardiner, Robert & Chesneau, Roger (1995), Conway's All the World's Fighting Ships 1947-1995, Conway Maritime Press, London, .
 Marriott, Leo, 1983.  Royal Navy Frigates 1945-1983, Ian Allan Ltd.  

 

Tribal-class frigates
1960 ships